Ynysddu Welfare Football Club is a Welsh football team based in Ynysddu, a small village and community of the lower Sirhowy Valley in south-east Wales. They currently play in the Gwent Premier League Premier Division, which is the fourth tier of the FAW Pyramid System.

History
Association Football in Ynysddu began in 1905, with the launch of Ynysddu Albion AFC. The club then changed its name to Ynysddu Crusaders AFC in 1915, and existed until the outbreak of World War Two in 1939, when it disbanded.

The two local wartime clubs, Ynysddu Celtic and Cwmfelinfach Rangers merged at the end of the war in 1945–46 to become Ynysddu Welfare AFC.

The club played in the South Wales Amateur Football League from Season 1946/47 to 2011/12, when they transferred to the Gwent County FA League for Season 2012/13 onwards.

Following the formal amalgamation of Ynysddu Welfare AFC and Crusaders Seniors AFC in 2008, the club then became Ynysddu Crusaders FC' until the summer of 2013 when the club renamed themselves Ynysddu Welfare FC.

They club are affiliated to the Gwent County Football Association. The first team play in the Gwent Premier League and the reserve team play in the North Gwent Football League.

Honours
South Wales Amateur Football League Division Two – Champions: 1987–88; 2001–02 Monmouthshire County FA Cup Winners: 1947-48. Gwent County FA League Division Three Champions: 2012-13.
Gwent County FA League Division Two – Champions: 2017–18.
Gwent County FA Amateur Cup – Winners: 2017–18.

External links
Official twitter
Official Facebook

References

Football clubs in Wales
Gwent County League clubs
South Wales Amateur League clubs
Association football clubs established in 1945
1945 establishments in Wales